MKTO is the self-titled debut studio album by American musical duo MKTO. It was released on January 30, 2014 in Australia and New Zealand, and was released on April 1 in North America.

Background
The album was released on January 30, 2014 in Australia and New Zealand. The album was released in the US on April 1, 2014. MKTO stands for "Misfit Kids and Total Outcasts". The duo explains that the title fits the album and it represents the kind of kids they were in high school.

Singles
The album's lead single, and the duo's debut single, "Thank You", was released on November 12, 2012. It has since been followed up by two further singles: "Classic", which was released on 20 June 2013; and "God Only Knows", released on 29 November 2013. On April 8, 2014, "American Dream" was released as the fourth single and on August 27, 2014, the duo confirmed via an Instagram post that the Max Martin penned "Forever Until Tomorrow" had been announced as the fifth Australian single, with its radio release immediate.

Chart performance
In Australia, MKTO debuted at number one on the Australian ARIA albums chart. In the US, MKTO reached Number 31 on the Billboard 200. The album is certified gold in Denmark and sold 10,000 units.

Critical reception

Matt Collar of AllMusic gave the album a positive review, stating the album "showcases the duo's one-two punch style, which usually consists of Oller's resonant vocals backed by Kelly's playful raps. What could end up sounding gimmicky or contrived doesn't, as Kelly (who some may remember as Walt on Lost) and Oller reveal they have enough thoughtful irreverence and technical skill to keep things interesting." Melissa Redman of Renowned for Sound gave the album 4 out of 5 stars stating that "All songs contain a dynamic energy, and it's evident in the music that the duo had fun creating these tracks" and "MKTO's album delivers a great variety of songs."

Track listing

Source:

Personnel
MKTO
Malcolm David Kelley - vocals
Tony Oller - vocals

Charts

Weekly charts

Year-end charts

Certification

References

External links
 MKTO on iTunes

2014 debut albums
MKTO albums